Percy Monkman, entertainer, actor and painter (1892–1986), was born in Bradford where he lived until retirement (1952) when he moved to Baildon  away at the edge of the moors.

Life
In 1909, aged 17, he joined Beckett's Bank (which was taken over by The Westminster Bank in 1921).

A year after World War I broke out, he joined the Royal Army Medical Corps (RAMC). After a few months he found a talent for entertaining other soldiers as a pierrot with the 13th Corps Concert Party and did this for the rest of the war in up to 300 events.

After the war was over, he returned to the bank in Bradford and continued as a compere and comedian. In 1935 he joined the Bradford Civic Theatre where he performed in many productions, usually in comic roles. Many were plays by  JB Priestley, man of letters, lifelong friend and the most celebrated Bradfordian of that generation.

He also took up painting, mainly in watercolours. He studied at the Bradford School of Art and joined Bradford Arts Club where he remained a member for over 60 years, serving later as vice-chairman, chairman and president. He painted predominantly town and country scenes around Bradford, the Brontë Country and the Yorkshire Dales, particularly Wharfedale and Airedale. He exhibited widely throughout Yorkshire and also at the Royal Institute of Painters in Water Colours (the RI). He was a regular contributor for the Dalesman magazine. After retirement he was able to devote all his time to painting for the rest of his life. He was very prolific and his work was widely respected by peers and the general public.

As well as his friendship with JB Priestley, he had many friends connected with the worlds of both art and the theatre in Bradford and the wider West Riding.

He was also a passionate supporter of Bradford City AFC, having been born within a mile of Valley Parade and even trialled for the club as a teenager. When growing up in the Toller Lane area both he and JB Priestley regularly played football together (Toller Lane Tykes and Saltburn United). A photograph of Percy was published in the Sunday Times on the 19 May 1985 showing him pay his final visit to Valley Parade the day after the tragedy of the Bradford City Fire on 11 May 1985 when 56 people lost their lives and 250 suffered injuries.

In March 2018, Percy's grandson, Martin Greenwood, published a comprehensive biography about Monkman entitled Percy Monkman: An Extraordinary Bradfordian. Whilst researching the book, Greenwood was hospitalised after breathing in spores from his grandfathers 100-year old documents.

See also
Monkman surname.

Further reading

References

External links
1960 short film featuring Monkman

1892 births
1986 deaths
British Army personnel of World War I
Artists from Bradford
20th-century English painters